Jay Robert Aldrich (born April 14, 1961) is a former Major League Baseball player who pitched for the Milwaukee Brewers, Atlanta Braves and the Baltimore Orioles. 

Aldrich attended Montclair State University, and in 1981 he played collegiate summer baseball with the Chatham A's of the Cape Cod Baseball League. He was selected by the Brewers in the 10th round of the 1982 MLB Draft. In 1995, Aldrich signed on as a replacement player for the Pittsburgh Pirates before the resolution of the player's strike.

References

External links

Living people
1961 births
Atlanta Braves players
Baltimore Orioles players
Chatham Anglers players
Milwaukee Brewers players
Montclair State Red Hawks baseball players
Baseball players from Louisiana
Sportspeople from Alexandria, Louisiana
Pikeville Brewers players
Beloit Brewers players
El Paso Diablos players
Rochester Red Wings players
Stockton Ports players
Denver Zephyrs players
Phoenix Firebirds players